Souls is a Bangladeshi rock band formed in Chittagong in 1972.

History
In 1972, singer Tajul Imam, guitarists Sajedul Alam and Momtazul Hoque Lulu, bassist Subrata Barua Ronny, and drummer/keyboardist Ahmed Newaz formed Souls.

In 1982, Naseem Ali Khan and Ayub Bachchu joined. The band started writing and composing their own songs while performing cover songs of western bands in hotels.

In 1982, they released their debut album, Super Souls, which was one of the first albums released by a music group in Bangladesh, along with the debut album of the band Shocking Blue. The album features the song "Mon Shudhu Mon Chuyeche", written and composed by Naquib Khan and Tapan Chowdhury on the vocals of the song. Abdullah Al Mamun wrote the lyrics to the song, "Mukhorito Jibon" and "Voole Gecho Tumi" from the same album.

In 1986, a reconfigured Souls released their third album, Manush Matir Kacha Kachi, which contains the songs "Eitoh Ekhane Brishti Bheja", "Ek Jhaak Paakhi", and "Muthor Bhetor Poddo".

In 1988, they released their fourth album, East and West, which had six English and six Bengali songs. Even though they had started their career singing English songs, this was the first time they released them. The songs were all written and composed by the band. Afterwards, Ayub Bachchu left Souls to form Little River Band, which was later renamed Love Runs Blind and is widely known by its acronym, LRB.

In 1993, Souls released their fifth album, E Emon Porichoy, which was Tapan Chowdhury's last appearance in Souls. Afterwards, he left the band to pursue a solo career. In 1995, Souls released their sixth album, Aj Din Katuk Gaane, which features popular songs "Keno Ei Nisshongota", sung by Partha, and "Bestota" and "Chaa-er Cup-e", the song was written by renowned lyricist Shahid Mahmud Jangi, sung by Naseem Ali. In 1997, Souls released their seventh album, Oshomoyer Gaan which features the songs "Oshomoyer Gaan", "Ami Ar Bhabbo Na", and "Oi Dure Neel".

In 2000, they released their first acoustic album, Mukhorito Jibon; it compiled some previously released songs, some remakes of old Indian Bengali songs, and some newly released songs. "Sharadin Tomay Behbe", "Bashi Shune Ar", and "Mukhorito Jibon" were some of the more widely played tracks from the album. In 2003 and 2004 respectively, they released their ninth and tenth albums, Tarar Uthan and To-Let. To-Let was the last album that sound engineer Mobin worked on before his death in a highway accident in Bangladesh.

Jhut-Jhamela was released in 2006. Kingbodonti, a musical tribute to Sanjeeb Choudhury, by Dalchhut and Souls. It was released on 25 December. It features three songs by Souls, three songs by Dalchhut and one song by Sanjeeb Choudhury, which is the title track. Their most recent album is Jam, which was released in 2011.

Discography 
Super Souls (1980)
কলেজের করিডোরে (In the Corridors of College) (1982)
মানুষ মাটির কাছাকাছি (People Are Close to the Ground) (1987)
East & West (1988)
এ এমন পরিচয় (It's Such an Identity) (1993)
আজ দিন কাটুক গানে (Let the Days Pass in Songs) (1995)
অসময়ের গান (Untimely Songs) (1997)
মুখরিত জীবন – Unplugged (Happy Life – Unplugged) (2000)
তারার উঠোনে (In the Backyard of Stars) (2003)
To-Let (2004)
ঝুট ঝামেলা (Junk Trouble) (2006)
কিংবদন্তি (A Tribute to Sanjeeb Choudhury) (2008)
Jam (2011)
বন্ধু (Friend) (2017)

Members 
Current members
 Naseem Ali Khan – lead vocals 
 Partha Barua – lead guitar, vocals 
 Ahasanur Rahman Ashiq – drums, percussion 
 Meer Shahriar Hossain Masum – keyboards 
 Maruf Hasan Talukder Real – bass guitar 

Past members

 Tapan Chowdhury – lead vocals 
 Naquib Khan – keyboards, vocals 
 Ayub Bachchu – guitars, vocals 
 Shahbaz Khan Pilu – bass 
 Tajul Imam – lead vocals 
 Sazedul Alam – guitars 
 Momtazul Haque Lulu – guitars 
 Ahmed Newaz – keyboards 
 Subrata Barua Ronny – drums 
 Gerald Gonsalves – keyboards 
 Mohammad Ali – bass 
 Suhas Hasnain – keyboards 
 Shahedul Alam – bass 
 Lutfur Kabir Azad – keyboards 
 Pantha Kanai – drums 
 Iftikher Uddin Sohel – lead guitar 
 Naimul Hasan Tanim – bass guitar 
 Zakir Hasan Rana – bass guitar

References

External links

Bangladeshi rock music groups
Musical groups established in 1970
Bangladeshi blues rock musical groups
Musical groups from Chittagong